The Geeta Mandir is a Hindu temple located at Model Town, Jalandhar, city of Punjab, India. It is dedicated to Lord krishana. Located in Model town. it is one of the most active temples in the Jalandhar city after Devi Talab Mandir.

History 
Geeta Mandir is dedicated to Lord Krishna and is located near Nikku Park in model town, Jalandhar, Punjab. The temple contains a gorgeous statue of Radha Krishna. The temple is crowded during Janmastami festival. The temple is famous for its Spiritual enlightenment.

Popularity 

 Pargat Singh Mla of Jalandhar Welcome at Geeta Mandir Jalandhar
 Devotees Visited on Krishna Janmasthami. 
 Ram Navami 
 Gita Temple 
 Hanuman Temple
 Shiva Temple

References 

Hindu temples in Punjab, India
Jalandhar